Her Maternal Right is lost American silent film directed by John Ince and Robert Thornby and stars Kitty Gordon. World Film Corporation distributed.

Cast
Kitty Gordon - Nina Seasbury
Zena Keefe - Mary Winslow
George Relph - Emory Townsend
Frank Evans - Amos Nelson
Warner Richmond

References

External links

1916 films
American silent feature films
Lost American films
Films directed by John Ince
Films directed by Robert Thornby
American black-and-white films
World Film Company films
1910s American films